Robert Maurice Campbell (born March 1, 1935) was a justice of the Supreme Court of Texas from December 1, 1978 to January 6, 1988.

References

Justices of the Texas Supreme Court
1935 births
Living people